The discography of Anastacia, an American singer, consists of seven studio albums, 29 singles, 30 music videos, and two DVDs.

She released her debut album, Not That Kind on June 16, 2000. The album reached the top ten in eight countries in Europe and Asia. It went four times platinum in Europe and triple platinum in Australia; her debut single "I'm Outta Love" was a global smash hit in 1999 topping the charts in Belgium, Australia and New Zealand, peaking at number two in France, Switzerland, Italy and Ireland as well as also reaching number six in Germany. The second single "Not That Kind" reached number 11 in the UK and became a Top 10 hit in Italy. It also entered the Top 20 in Switzerland and France. "Cowboys & Kisses" was released as the third single off the album, charting in the top forty in some European countries. As the last promotional only single, "Made for Lovin' You" charted in the UK at number twenty-seven and in France at number seventy-two.

Her second album Freak of Nature released in 2001, achieved successful sales in the UK where it went triple platinum as well as being a hit throughout continental Europe, however unlike her debut it did not match the same level of international success. The first single released was "Paid My Dues". The song became an overall hit, in 2001, peaking in Denmark, Italy, Norway, and Switzerland, and reaching the top ten in several other mainland European countries. The second single, released in 2002, "One Day in Your Life", reached number eleven in the UK and the top ten in many European countries. The next single "Why'd You Lie to Me" reached the top thirty in the UK. "You'll Never Be Alone", the fourth single, reached number twenty-eight on the Adult Contemporary chart in the US.

Anastacia quickly became her most successful album to date, giving her a third consecutive triple platinum album in the UK and reaching the top of national charts of Ireland, the Netherlands, Australia, Greece, Germany and other countries. Unlike her first two albums, which were released in her homeland of America, Anastacia was not, despite being scheduled for release on three occasions. The first single, released in March, was "Left Outside Alone", which saw a change in direction for Anastacia. It was one of the biggest songs in Europe of 2004, reaching number one Austria, Italy, Spain, Switzerland and number two in Denmark, Germany, Ireland, the Netherlands, Norway and number three in the United Kingdom and Hungary. Overall the song remained at No. 1 on the European Billboards for 15 weeks. The song also peaked in the Australian charts where it went on to become the countries' second biggest selling single of 2004. Anastacia released three further internationally successful singles; "Sick and Tired" (which gave her another number one in Spain and another UK top five single), "Welcome to My Truth" (her best-selling hit in Spain), and the ballad "Heavy on My Heart" proceeds from the sale of which went towards her Anastacia Fund (a charitable organization providing research funding for breast cancer).

On July 24, Anastacia announced that her fourth studio album Heavy Rotation would be released October 27, 2008, in Europe and Asia (and elsewhere in 2009). Her fourth studio album proved to be less successful than her previous ones; her singles failed to reach the top 40 in her most commercially successful country (UK). The album's first single, called "I Can Feel You", began playing in some radio markets on August 25, 2008. The second single from Heavy Rotation was "Absolutely Positively", later served as a promotional single only. The third official single from the album had been confirmed as "Defeated" and was released as a promotional single only in Europe without a music video.

It's a Man's World, a collection of her covers by rock male artists was released on November 9, 2012. Anastacia confirmed via her Twitter account that she was currently writing songs for producers John Fields and Steve Diamond, and also recording her sixth studio album which will return to her own chosen "sprock" sound. The album, entitled Resurrection, was released in May 2014 with the lead single "Stupid Little Things" released on April 4. In 2017 it presents to the world a new album entitled Evolution, which is enjoying great success in Europe, and entering the top 100 in the United States ranking.

Albums

Studio albums

Compilation albums

Live albums

Video albums

Singles

As lead artist

Collaborations

Other appearances

Music videos

Notes

References

External links
 

Discography
Discographies of American artists
Pop music discographies
Contemporary R&B discographies
Soul music discographies